Gilded Lies is a 1921 American silent drama film directed by William P.S. Earle and starring Eugene O'Brien, Martha Mansfield and Frank Whitson.

Cast
 Eugene O'Brien as Keene McComb
 Martha Mansfield as Hester Thorpe
 Frank Whitson as 	Martin Ward
 George Stewart as Andrew Scott
 Arthur Donaldson as Major Burns

References

Bibliography
 Connelly, Robert B. The Silents: Silent Feature Films, 1910-36, Volume 40, Issue 2. December Press, 1998.
 Munden, Kenneth White. The American Film Institute Catalog of Motion Pictures Produced in the United States, Part 1. University of California Press, 1997.

External links
 

1921 films
1921 drama films
1920s English-language films
American silent feature films
Silent American drama films
American black-and-white films
Films directed by William P. S. Earle
Selznick Pictures films
1920s American films